Robert Young Overing (1872-1933) was a Canadian Anglican priest, most notably  Archdeacon of St Andrews in the Diocese of Montreal from 1928 until his death.

Overing was educated at the Montreal Diocesan Theological College and ordained in 1896. After a curacy at  Valleyfield he held incumbencies at Buckingham, Stanbridge East and Montreal.

References

1872 births
1933 deaths
19th-century Canadian Anglican priests
20th-century Canadian Anglican priests
Archdeacons of St Andrews, PQ
Alumni of Montreal Diocesan Theological College